Kunzea glabrescens, commonly known as spearwood, is a flowering plant in the myrtle family, Myrtaceae and is endemic to the south-west of Western Australia. It is a large shrub with leaves and flowers similar to those of K. ericifolia but has differently shaped bracteoles. It is often common in wet areas around Perth.

Description
The flowers are arranged in dense heads of 18 to 28 mainly on the ends of the longer branches. Flowering mostly occurs in October and November and is followed by fruit which are urn-shaped capsules.

Taxonomy and naming
Kunzea glabrescens was first formally described in 1996 by Hellmut R. Toelken from a specimen collected near Lake Goolelal in Greenwood and the description was published in Journal of the Adelaide Botanic Gardens. The specific epithet (glabrescens) is derived from the Latin word glaber meaning "hairless", "bald" or "smooth" and the suffix -escens meaning "becoming", referring to the leaves being hairless or becoming so with age. The genus was named after Gustav Kunze who was a professor of botany, entomologist and physician.

Distribution and habitat
Kunzea glabrescens typically grows in sandy soil and is often found in wet depressions and along watercourses as far north as Gingin and then south through the Swan Coastal Plain, Peel region through the South West region and extending into the Great Southern region as far east as Albany.

Conservation
This kunzea is listed as "not threatened" by the Government of Western Australia Department of Parks and Wildlife.

References

 glabrescens
Endemic flora of Western Australia
Myrtales of Australia
Rosids of Western Australia
Plants described in 1996
Taxa named by Hellmut R. Toelken